The Kingtown King Park, also known as King's Residence, is a residential skyscraper located in Gushan District, Kaohsiung, Taiwan. It was completed in 2016 and houses 118 apartment units. As of December 2020, it is the 8th tallest building in Kaohsiung.

See also 
 List of tallest buildings in Taiwan
 List of tallest buildings in Kaohsiung
 King's Town Hyatt

References

External links
Official Website of Kingtown King Park 

2016 establishments in Taiwan
Residential skyscrapers in Taiwan
Skyscrapers in Kaohsiung
Apartment buildings in Taiwan
Residential buildings completed in 2016
Neoclassical architecture in Taiwan